Giacomazzi is an Italian surname. Notable people with the surname include:

Giovanni Giacomazzi (1928–1995), Italian footballer
Guillermo Giacomazzi (born 1977), Uruguayan footballer

See also
Giacobazzi

Italian-language surnames
Patronymic surnames
Surnames from given names